Helldorado may refer to:
Helldorado, a nickname for Tombstone, Arizona (a variation of El Dorado) created by a disgruntled miner who wrote a letter in July 1881 to the Tombstone Nugget newspaper complaining about trying to find his fortune and ending up washing dishes
Helldorado (album), the eighth album by W.A.S.P., released in 1999
Helldorado (band), a Norwegian Americana band
Helldorado Days (Las Vegas), a rodeo, parade and festival in Las Vegas, Nevada (first held 1934)
Helldorado Days (Tombstone), an annual celebration and parade in Tombstone, Arizona (first held 1929)
Helldorado (video game), a 2007 strategy video game
Helldorado (film), a 1934 American film, starring Ralph Bellamy
Heldorado a 1946 Roy Rogers film set in the Las Vegas Helldorado Days celebrations

See also 

El Dorado (disambiguation)